Zarya is a rural locality (a settlement) in Stepnovskoye Rural Settlement, Leninsky District, Volgograd Oblast, Russia. The population was 142 as of 2010. There are 4 streets.

Geography 
The village is located on Caspian Depression, 87 km from Volgograd, 30 km from Leninsk, 15 km from Stepnoy.

References 

Rural localities in Leninsky District, Volgograd Oblast